Fowey and Tywardreath was an electoral division of Cornwall in the United Kingdom which returned one member to sit on Cornwall Council between 2013 and 2021. It was abolished at the 2021 local elections, being succeeded by Fowey, Tywardreath and Par.

Councillors

Extent
Fowey and Tywardreath represented the town of Fowey, the villages of Tywardreath, Polkerris, and Golant, and the hamlets of Torfrey and Treesmill. It also covered parts of the hamlet of Polmear (which was shared with the Par and St Blazey Gate division). The division covered 2446 hectares in total.

Election results

2017 election

2013 election

References

Electoral divisions of Cornwall Council
Fowey